In 2001 there were seven special elections to the United States House of Representatives in the 107th United States Congress.

Summary 

Elections are listed by date and district.

|-
! 
| Bud Shuster
|  | Republican
| 1972
|  | Incumbent resigned, effective January 31, 2001.New member elected May 15, 2001.Republican hold.
| nowrap | 

|-
! 
| Julian Dixon
|  | Democratic
| 1978
|  | Incumbent died December 8, 2000.New member elected June 5, 2001.Democratic hold.
| nowrap | 

|-
! 
| Norman Sisisky
|  | Democratic
| 1982
|  | Incumbent died March 29, 2001.New member elected June 19, 2001.Republican gain.
| nowrap | 

|-
! 
| Joe Scarborough
|  | Republican
| 1994
|  | Incumbent resigned, effective September 6, 2001.New member elected October 16, 2001.Republican hold.
| nowrap | 

|-
! 
| Joe Moakley
|  | Democratic
| 1972
|  | Incumbent died May 28, 2001.New member elected October 16, 2001.Democratic hold.
| nowrap | 

|-
! 
| Asa Hutchinson
|  | Republican
| 1996
|  | Incumbent resigned August 5, 2001 to head the Drug Enforcement Administration.New member elected November 20, 2001.Republican hold.
| nowrap | 

|-
! 
| Floyd Spence
|  | Republican
| 1970
|  | Incumbent died August 16, 2001.New member elected December 18, 2001.Republican hold.
| nowrap | 

|}

See also 
 List of special elections to the United States House of Representatives

References 

 
2001